Honor Flaherty ( – 11 March 1848) was an Irish Famine victim.

Biography

Flaherty and her husband, Bart, lived in Kilkieran, which at the time was suffering from the famine and widespread fever. The family had gone to the workhouse for help, but had been discharged on 9 December. Since then, Bart had received daily rations but soon after returning home three of their four children - Martin, Mary, and Pat - all died. 

Overseer James Cooke and a Mark Connelly had gone to the Flahertys' hut in search of a calf recently stolen from his land. Looking through an opening in the wall of the hut, 

[they] saw Bart Flaherty, his wife Honor, a woman named Bridget Marmion, and Margaret Flaherty, daughter of Bart Flaherty, lying on the floor, and the hide of the calf placed over them.

Bart, and the following day, Honor, were arrested and delivered to Clifden Bridewell in atrocious conditions. Honor "was in a very sickly condition ... the day was extremely cold and severe ... he did not hear the woman complain during the journey; she was offered bread by her husband but refused to eat it." The convoy arrived at 11.00 p.m. and were admitted by Dominick Kerrigan, who later stated that:

The wife appeared to me to be quite dead, upon which they dragged her out of the car like a dead sheep, and pulled her into the door and left her and the husband ... in my custody .. to my astonishment she never moved a hand or foot since that moment, and never uttered a word. Such cruel treatment of human beings is revolting to human nature. Her husband says that they were so treated that all their family died of starvation, and shocking to relate that the unfortunate victim, the deceased, cut off the feet from the ankles of one of the children and eat of them.

The child's grave was investigated:

... a short distance outside (the cabin), covered merely with a sod and a few stones, lying on the surface of the ground, where the bodies of two of the children. They had been dead, according to his evidence (a Doctor Suffield), for about two months. It was impossible ... for any medical man to come to a conclusion as to whether the fleash of the legs had been torn or cut, the bodies being far advanced in decomposition.

Bart Flaherty's statement was not held credible either by his neighbours or the authorities. James Cooke was dismissed from service due to causing the death of Honor Flaherty by exposure.

See also

 Ó Flaithbertaigh
 Celia Griffin (1841-March 1847), famine victim.

References

 Patient Endurance:The Famine in Clifden, Kathleen Villars-Tuthill, Galway, 1990.

1848 deaths
People from County Galway
19th-century Irish people
Year of birth unknown